The  is a luxury sedan produced by Nissan for the Japanese market. The car's name is derived from Spanish for "summit". Earlier generations installed a hood ornament with an image of an acanthus leaf. The acanthus leaf was commonly used by classical Greeks to make a wreath for use as a crown.

In Japan, the Cima has traditionally been Nissan's rival to the Toyota Crown Royal Saloon G and later the Majesta. The Cima in the first two generations was a more luxurious and larger version of the Cedric and Gloria, with the Cima sharing the V8 engine from the earlier flagship President, Nissan's alternative to the Toyota Century. The Cima was introduced in 1988 and was based on an elongated Cedric/Gloria chassis. With its phenomenal sales—about 64,000 units sold the first year and 120,000 in four years—the car became a symbol of the "bubble economy".

The Cedric Cima was sold at Nissan Motor Stores, while the Gloria Cima was sold at Nissan Prince Stores. Later generations of the Cima shared the same platform as the President, with the Cima being a shorter version, thereby allowing Nissan to continue offering the Cima at Nissan Prince Store locations. The later iterations of the Cima were exported to the United States as the Infiniti Q45. The Q45 was discontinued after 2006, however the Cima and the President continued in production until August 2010, leaving the Fuga to become the lone flagship. April 2012, the Cima nameplate was resurrected, and resumed "flagship" status in Japan as a longer wheelbase version of the Fuga Hybrid.

In January 2021, Nissan announced that the Cima had been considered for cancellation for a second time, with production being halted at the end of 2020 while the current Nissan Japan website still lists it as available for new orders with a hybrid powertrain only in three trim levels. According to the Nissan Factory website at Tochigi, the Cima was renewed October 2021. It was announced on March 31, 2022 that Nissan is planning to end production of the Cima.



First generation (Y31; 1988) 

Both the Cedric/Gloria and its arch-rival, the Toyota Crown were stretched to this very limit, with larger engined versions also available. The bigger versions received larger bumpers to take advantage of the absence of exterior dimension restrictions, but were still somewhat of a half measure as the bodywork itself remained narrow.

When rumors came that Toyota was developing a larger, wider extension of the Crown, called the 4000 Royal Saloon G, Nissan acted hastily to add a full-sized version of the Cedric and Gloria. Nissan, however, was unable to get the wide version ready for the narrow version's launch in June 1987. The half-year gap in development, however, brought about many changes in design. The wider version was originally sold as the Cedric Cima or Gloria Cima, depending on which sales channel was being used. This generation was manufactured exclusively as a 4-door hardtop, with no B-pillar between the front and rear side glass windows. The interior was very lavish using genuine lacquer wood inserts throughout the interior and the upholstery was a choice between Connolly leather or a silk-wool combination. It was offered as the Type I Limited, the Type II-S or Type II Limited AV with the turbocharged engine and a color CRT interactive display for climate, navigation and sound system functions provided by Fujitsu Ten and a Sony CD changer which were earlier installed in the Nissan Leopard GT coupe. The steering wheel had a stationary center hub while the steering wheel rotated around it, providing stereo and cruise control buttons on the hub regardless of where the steering wheel was. There was an optionally available cellular phone installed in the armrest console and the center hub was available with cellphone buttons to dial numbers, connect or disconnect calls.

The Y31 Cima is available with a  VG30DE or a  turbocharged VG30DET. The turbocharged version was especially popular, leading the Japanese media to coin the term "the Cima phenomenon". The Cedric Cima was sold at dealerships Nissan Motor where the Laurel could be found in Japan, and the Gloria Cima was sold at Nissan dealerships Nissan Prince that sold the Skyline. The Cima was available with an electronically controlled air suspension and a center console color CRT-display for multiple audio and video and climate control functions.

Japanese actress Kazue Ito had originally purchased this generation at the age of 24 and continued to own and drive the car. The process took about 8 months from April 2021 and completed on December 7 of the same year. The car was presented at the Nissan Ginza showroom in Tokyo to Ito, and it was also announced in a Nissan press release on the same date, which coincided with her birthday.

Second generation (Y32; 1991) 

Following the Y32 Cedric/Gloria's June 1991 launch, the Cima was redesigned and introduced in August 1991. The car is simply known as the Cima, and remained the flagship offering at Nissan Prince Store locations alongside the Skyline and Gloria. Later in the year, Toyota launched the independent Crown Majesta competing with the sport-oriented trim levels. The collapse of the Japanese asset price bubble resulted in lower sales for either car, compared to Nissan's previous Y31 model and Toyota's S130 model Crown Royal Saloon G.

Initially the Cima was only available with the VH41DE series V8, a short-stroke version of the VH45DE found in the first Infiniti Q45. The air suspension introduced in the previous generation was replaced with Full-Active Suspension that was available on the US-spec Q45. Its appearance was said to reflect a more British appearance, both inside and out. An analog clock, found on most US-spec Infiniti during the same time period, also appeared in this vehicle. AWD and a V6 engine were also added to the options list.

Third generation (Y33; 1996) 

Unlike the previous, JDM only models, the third-generation Cima was also marketed overseas—as the second generation Infiniti Q45. Instead of the VH45DE engine, Nissan used the VH41DE due to reduced yearly road tax obligation while also offering the turbocharged V6 with smaller displacement. In 1999, the Cima was exclusive to reorganized Nissan JDM Nissan Red Stage dealerships , while the President was exclusive to Nissan Blue Stage locations. AWD was still offered in Japan only and it was the first car markteted in Japan with side airbags as standard equipment. As this generation was sold at Japanese Nissan dealerships next to the Skyline, the Cima was given a performance-car appearance to capitalize on the popularity of the Skyline.

In 1999, the Cima became the first Nissan with laser adaptive cruise control.

Fourth generation (F50; 2001) 

The fourth-generation Cima arrived in January 2001. The timing was early in the Nissan Revival Plan, so the Cima did not have the Skyline's FM platform. Instead, it features an updated version of the old President platform, with an updated rear suspension. However, Nissan's updated design identity was thoroughly worked into both the exterior and interior. This Cima became known for its unique 7-reflector headlights. The Cima was sold in the US as the Infiniti Q45. This model continued to be Nissan's rival to the Crown Majesta, and also competed for customers for three years with the Japan only Mitsubishi Proudia, however Mitsubishi chose to use front wheel drive.

The VK45DD direct-injection V8 features in the Japanese Cima, alongside the VQ30DET, both producing . The V8 in the Infiniti version produces . A Bose sound system was offered in June 2002. A LHD version of this generation was offered for sale in China at the Shanghai Auto Show in April 2003. Due to tightening emissions restrictions, the turbocharged vehicle was no longer offered on the V6 engine starting July 2005. The Q45 was no longer exported to the US after MY 2006. This generation of the Cima is very similar to the President.

In August 2010, Nissan announced that it had stopped the production of both the Cima and President, which share the same chassis. The two models needed safety upgrades to comply with the latest safety regulations, but lackluster sales showed that the company would not be able to recoup costs. In light of Nissan stopping development on a Cima/President successor, the Fuga has become the flagship in its lineup.

When the Fuga assumed the role as flagship sedan of Nissan Japan August 2010, it became the first time that Nissan didn't sell a premium luxury V8 sedan in Japan since 1964; the Fuga's North American cousin, the Infiniti M56, is offered with a V8 shared with the Infiniti QX56.

Fifth generation (Y51; 2012) 

Nissan revived the Cima nameplate as the long wheelbase version of the Fuga Hybrid. It also comes with Nissan's "Intelligent Dual Clutch Control", a one-motor two-clutch parallel hybrid system, that offers direct response, superb driving feel and low fuel consumption. Sales of this flagship hybrid sedan in Japan began May 21, 2012. It is a resurrection of a 1960s and 1970s styling trend called "coke bottle styling".

The reintroduction of the Cima to Japanese customers was done to offer an alternative to Toyota's limousines called the Century and the S210 series Crown Majesta which the Cima is now the direct alternative.

On April 16, 2014, it was announced that the current Cima will be offered in North America as the Infiniti Q70L beginning with the 2015 model year. A few Cimas were exported to other Asian countries such as Singapore by parallel import.

Nissan announced that production of the Cima will end by Summer 2022.

Mitsubishi Dignity 

From April 26, 2012 until November 30, 2016, Mitsubishi Motors sold a rebadged version of the HGY51 Cima under the Dignity nameplate. Aside from badging and some minor details, the Dignity was identical to the Cima.

References

External links 

 
 Nissan Sedan history at Nissan Japan

Cima
Cars introduced in 1988
1990s cars
2000s cars
2010s cars
2020s cars
Full-size vehicles
Luxury vehicles
Executive cars
Rear-wheel-drive vehicles
All-wheel-drive vehicles
Hybrid electric cars
Flagship vehicles
Vehicles with four-wheel steering
Cars discontinued in 2022